Maiestas latifrons (rice broad-headed leafhopper), formerly Recilia latifrons, is a species of bug from the Cicadellidae family that can be found in China, Japan, Korea, and the Russian maritime. It can be found on and feeds on rice plants. It was formerly placed within Recilia, but a 2009 revision moved it to Maiestas.

References

Hemiptera of Asia
Insects described in 1902
Maiestas
Taxa named by Shōnen Matsumura